Qi Yaolin (1863 – ?) was a Chinese politician of the late Qing Dynasty and early period of the Republic of China. He was born in Jilin. He was the last Qing governor of Henan from December 1911 to February 1912. In March 1912, the new Republican government appointed him military governor of Henan. He supported Yuan Shikai's restoration of the monarchy in December 1915.

Awards and decorations
Order of the Precious Brilliant Golden GrainOrder of the Golden GrainOrder of Wen-Hu

References

1863 births
1949 deaths
Qing dynasty politicians from Jilin
Republic of China politicians from Jilin
People from Siping
Businesspeople from Jilin
Empire of China (1915–1916)